The  is the site of the remains of an ancient settlement on Okinawa Island. Located in the Iha district of Uruma City, south of Ishikawa, the site sits on a large limestone fault slope, and dates from the late Shellmound period of Okinawan archaeology, coinciding with the late Jōmon period, c. 2500 – 1000 BC. The site was first discovered in 1920 by Ōyama Kashiwa, confirming that Okinawa was settled by ancient peoples, and is one of only a few fully excavated shell mounds in Okinawa. The site includes remains of fish and animal bones, earthen and stoneware, and goods made out of horn.

References 

Ryukyu Islands